Hypotrachyna aspera is a species of foliose lichen in the family Parmeliaceae.

References

aspera
Lichen species
Lichens described in 2002
Lichens of Brazil